Mill Creek flows into the Black River near Lyons Falls, New York.

References 

Rivers of Lewis County, New York